Armenia participated in the Junior Eurovision Song Contest 2014  which took place on 15 November 2014, in Marsa, Malta. The Armenian broadcaster Armenia 1 (ARMTV) was responsible for organising their entry for the contest. The Armenian entry was selected through a national final held on 14 September 2014. Betty and her song "People of the Sun" was chosen to represent the nation in Marsa, Malta.

Armenia finished 3rd in the final with 146 points.

Background

Prior to the 2014 Contest, Armenia had participated in the Junior Eurovision Song Contest seven times since its first entry in 2007, with their best result being in  when they won with the song "Mama", performed by Vladimir Arzumanyan. Armenia went on to host the Junior Eurovision Song Contest 2011, in the Armenian capital, Yerevan.

Before Junior Eurovision

National Selection
On 29 May 2014, ARMTV announced that a national final would be held to select Armenia's entry for the Junior Eurovision Song Contest 2014. A submission period for artists was held from 1 June 2014 to 15 August 2014. The broadcaster received 87 submissions. The ten finalists were revealed on 5 September 2014, while the running order was decided on 11 September.

Final
The national selection took place on 14 September 2014. Betty won with the song "People Of The Sun" and thus, Betty was chosen to represent Armenia.

Artist and song information

Betty

Elizabeth Danielyan  (Armenian: Էլիզաբեթ Դանիելյան, born 7 March 2003), better known as simply Betty (Armenian: Բեթթի), is an Armenian child singer. She represented Armenia in the Junior Eurovision Song Contest 2014 in Malta with her song "People of the Sun".

People of the Sun

"People of the Sun" is a song by Armenian child singer Betty.  It represented Armenia at the Junior Eurovision Song Contest 2014 in Marsa, Malta, placing 3rd with 146 points.

At Junior Eurovision 
At the running order draw which took place on 9 November 2014, Armenia were drawn to perform twelfth on 15 November 2014, following  and preceding .

Voting

Detailed voting results
The following members comprised the Armenian jury:
 Aram Sargsyan (Aram Mp3)
 Armina Darbinyan
 Zaruhi Babayan
 Alla Levonyan
 Erik Karapetyan

Notes

References

Junior Eurovision Song Contest
Armenia
2014